Yehuda D. Nevo (1932 – 12 February 1992) was a Middle Eastern archeologist living  in Israel.  He died after a long battle with cancer in 1992.

Research
Nevo discovered Kufic inscriptions in the Negev desert in Israel, four hundred of which were published in Ancient Arabic Inscriptions from the Negev. This led him and Judith Koren, a librarian at the University of Haifa, to re-examine the origins of Islam, and early Islamic history.

They fundamentally doubt the historicity of Islamic traditional accounts of early Islam, thus adhering to the Revisionist School of Islamic Studies. Nevo and Koren co-authored a work called Crossroads to Islam: The Origins of the Arab Religion and the Arab State, which presents a theory of the origins and development of the Islamic state and religion. According to them, the Arabs conquered the Near East with a mixture of pre-Islamic pagan and "Indeterminate Monotheistic" beliefs. The Arab's beliefs were modified in contact with the Jewish-Christian monotheism they encountered in the conquered land. Nevo's research cast doubts on the historicity of the traditional narrative of Muhammad as a prophet and the traditional history of the Quran.

https://en.m.wikipedia.org/wiki/Historicity_of_Muhammad#cite_note-2

Some of Nevo's work is also published in the book Quest for the Historical Muhammad, edited by Ibn Warraq.

Quote 
Since external evidence is necessary to corroborate a view derived solely from the Muslim literary account, lack of such corroboration is an important argument against that account's historicity. This approach is therefore more open than the 'traditional' to acceptance of an argumentum e silentio. For if we are ready to discount an uncorroborated report of an event, we must accept that there may be nothing with which to replace it: that the event simply did not happen. That there is no evidence for it outside of the "traditional account" thus becomes positive evidence in support of the hypothesis that it did not happen. A striking example is the lack of evidence, outside the Muslim literature, for the view that the Arabs were Muslim at the time of the Conquest. 
"Methodological Approaches to Islamic Studies" in Warraq, The Quest for the Historical Muhammad p. 425

Publications
 Crossroads to Islam : the origins of the Arab religion and the Arab state, Yehuda D. Nevo and Judith Koren, Prometheus Books, Amherst, NY, (2003) 
 "The Origins of the Muslim Descriptions of the Jahili Meccan Sanctuary", Journal of Near Eastern Studies, 1990, no 1 
 Ancient Arabic inscriptions from the Negev, edited by Yehuda D. Nevo, Zemira Cohen, Dalia Heftman, IPS, Negev, Israel, (1993) 
 Pagans and herders : a re-examination of the Negev runoff cultivation systems in the Byzantine and early Arab periods, Yehuda D. Nevo, IPS, Negev, Israel, (1991)

References

Israeli orientalists
Jewish orientalists
Scholars of medieval Islamic history
1992 deaths
Year of birth missing